Frenchie or Frenchy may refer to:

Nickname
Frenchy Bordagaray (1910–2000), American Major League Baseball player
John Boulos (1921–2002), Haitian-American soccer player
Ovila Cayer (1844–1909), American Civil War Union Army soldier from Quebec, Canada, and recipient of the Medal of Honor
Percy Creuzot (1924–2010), founder of Frenchy's Chicken, a restaurant chain in Houston
Frenchie Davis (born 1979), American Broadway performer and soul, dance/electronica, and pop singer
Jeff Francoeur (born 1984), American Major League Baseball player
John Fuqua (born 1946), American former National Football League player
Alphonse Lacroix (1897–1973), American ice hockey goaltender, member of the 1924 US Olympic team
George LeClair (1886–1918), American Major League Baseball pitcher
Réal Lemieux (1945–1975), Canadian National Hockey League player
Fred Mader (1883–?), American labor leader and mobster
Sam Marx (1859–1933), father of the Marx Brothers
Angelique Morgan, a reality TV star and ex-adult film star, best known for her VH1 appearances
Claude Raymond (born 1937), professional baseball player
Frenchy Uhalt (1910–2004), Major League Baseball outfielder

Stage or ring name
Frenchie (rapper), American rapper Greg Hogan (born 1985)
Frenchie, Francois Allegre of the band Raggasonic
"Frenchie", nickname of French professional jockey Cédric Ségeon
Frenchy (comedian), Australian comedian and YouTuber
Frenchy Martin, ring name of Jean Gagné, French Canadian retired professional wrestler and manager

Fictional characters
Frenchy, in the 1939 Western film Destry Rides Again, portrayed by Marlene Dietrich
Frenchy Fairmont, in the 1952 Western film Rancho Notorious, also played by Dietrich
Frenchy, in the films Grease (1978) and Grease 2 (1982), portrayed by Didi Conn
Frenchy Hercules, in the 1980 film Forbidden Zone played by Marie–Pascale Elfman
Frenchy, in the early '90s TV show In Living Color, played by Keenen Ivory Wayans
Frenchy, in the 2000 film Small Time Crooks, played by Tracey Ullman
Frenchie (comics), a Marvel Comics character and associate of Moon Knight
Frenchy the Clown, created by National Lampoon

Other uses
Frenchie (film), a 1950 American Western, starring Shelley Winters as the title character
Frenchy (film), an unreleased action film starring Jean-Claude Van Damme
Frenchie (dog), a nickname for the French Bulldog breed of dog

See also
 French people
 Frenchy's Chicken, a restaurant chain in Texas, founded by Percy "Frenchy" Creuzot
 Castle Rock, Utah, United States, a ghost town also known as "Frenchies"
 Franchy Cordero (born 1994), Dominican professional baseball outfielder
 Frenchi, a type of cane beetle

Lists of people by nickname